The 2014 State Bank of India ATP Challenger Tour was a professional tennis tournament played on outdoor hard courts. It is the first edition of the tournament for the men. It was part of the 2014 ATP Challenger Tour. It took place in Kolkata, India, from 10–15 February 2014.

Singles main draw entrants

Seeds 

 1 Rankings as of 3 February 2014

Other entrants 
The following players received wildcards into the singles main draw:
  Somdev Devvarman
  Saketh Myneni
  Vishnu Vardhan
  Sanam Singh

The following players received entry from the qualifying draw:
  Yang Tsung-hua
  Rui Machado
  Huang Liang-chi
  Chen Ti

Champions

Singles 

  Ilija Bozoljac def.  Evgeny Donskoy, 6–1, 6–1

Doubles 

  Saketh Myneni /  Sanam Singh def.  Divij Sharan /  Vishnu Vardhan, 6–3, 3–6, [10–4]

External links 
Official Website

2014
State Bank of India ATP Challenger Tour
State Bank of India ATP Challenger Tour
State Bank of India ATP Challenger Tour
Sports competitions in Kolkata